Columbus is a 1933 opera by Werner Egk. Originally a radio opera, Egk revised it in 1942 for the stage. The Munich premiere was acclaimed in the press and joined the year's repertoire at the Freiburg Theatre, though some dissented. The lack of melody in the opera brought negative comment from Richard Strauss in comparison to Meyerbeer's grand opera on the life of the Portuguese explorer Vasco da Gama L'Africaine.

Recording
Columbus - Ernst Gutstein, Fritz Wunderlich, Hans Herbert Fiedler, Willy Ferenz, Georg Pappas, Chor des Bayerischen Rundfunks, Bavarian Radio Symphony Orchestra, Werner Egk

References

1933 operas
German-language operas
Operas by Werner Egk
Operas
Radio operas
Cultural depictions of Christopher Columbus